Tõnu Lepik (born 1 May 1946 in Tallinn) is an Estonian former long jumper who competed in the 1968 Summer Olympics and in the 1976 Summer Olympics.

He won the 1970 European Athletics Indoor Championships with 8.05, Estonian national record.

References

External links

1946 births
Living people
Estonian male long jumpers
Athletes from Tallinn
Olympic athletes of the Soviet Union
Athletes (track and field) at the 1968 Summer Olympics
Athletes (track and field) at the 1976 Summer Olympics
European Athletics Championships medalists
Soviet male long jumpers